Tyrendarra is a locality in south west Victoria, Australia. The locality is split between the Shire of Glenelg and the Shire of Moyne local government areas, with most being in the former. The Tyrendarra township lies within a bend of Darlot Creek, before it enters the Fitzroy River—which also flows through the locality.

The area was settled in the 1870s and a Post Office opened around February 1879 and closed in 2000.

Tyrendarra is well known for the Tyrendarra Pastoral and Agricultural show held each year at the Tyrendarra sports reserve. The Tyrendarra Rodeo has, since 2017, been replaced with the Tyrendarra Beer Fest.

The town has an Australian rules football team playing in the South West District Football League.

Unusually for Australian towns, Tyrendarra has no hotel. The town does, however, contain two churches.

The Tyrendarra Indigenous Protected Area, which lies on the Tyrendarra lava flow from the extinct volcano Budj Bim lies between the Fitzroy River and Darlot Creek close to the township.

Traditional ownership
The formally recognised traditional owners for the area in which Tyrendarra sits are the Gunditjmara People who are represented by the Gunditj Mirring Traditional Owners Aboriginal Corporation.

People from Tyrendarra
 Noel Fulford Learmonth, (1880–1970) writer
 Noel's son Wing Commander Charles Learmonth, (1917–1944) DFC and bar

References

 Learmonth, Noel F. (1970). Four Towns and a Survey. Hawthorn Press: Melbourne

External links

Towns in Victoria (Australia)
Coastal towns in Victoria (Australia)